The 2013 Sophia Awards (Portuguese: Prémios Sophia 2013) were the 2013 edition of the Sophia Awards, an award presented by the Portuguese Academy of Cinema to honour the best in Portuguese filmmaking. The award ceremony took place on October 6, 2013 at the São Carlos National Theatre in Lisbon, Portugal.

Winners and nominees

Awards 
Winners are listed first and highlighted in boldface.

Other awards

Career Awards
Acácio de Almeida
José Manuel Castello Lopes
Laura Soveral

Sophia Award of Merit and Excellency
Manoel de Oliveira

Films with multiple nominations and awards

The following 11 films received multiple nominations:

The following 4 films received multiple awards:

References 

2012 film awards
2013 in Portugal
Sophia Awards 2013
2010s in Lisbon
October 2013 events in Europe
Events in Lisbon